The Woolsey Ranchhouse Ruins, located north of Humboldt, Arizona off State Route 69, is a historic site with significance dating to 1863.  It is a remnant of King Woolsey's ranch and is listed on the National Register of Historic Places.

A  area including the ruins was listed on the National Register in 1977.

References 

Ranches on the National Register of Historic Places in Arizona
Buildings and structures completed in 1863
Buildings and structures in Yavapai County, Arizona
1863 establishments in Arizona Territory
Ruins in the United States
National Register of Historic Places in Yavapai County, Arizona
Woolsey family